Friends in High Places is the fourth album in the live praise and worship series of contemporary worship music by Hillsong Church. In 1999 the album was certified gold by Australian Recording Industry Association (ARIA) for shipment of 35000 units.

Making of the album
Friends in High Places was recorded live at The Hills Entertainment Centre by Geoff Bullock, Darlene Zschech, and the Hillsong team. This is the final album on which Bullock appeared. He left the church later that year (1995).

The majority of the songs were written by Bullock, Zschech, and Russell Fragar.

Reception 

In December 1997 Peter Dilley of Cross Rhythms rated the album as 9 out of 10 and distinguished between the group and their contemporaries in United States and United Kingdom: "what sets Australian-sourced recordings apart from many US/UK worship releases is not so much their innovation as the unrestrained energy and vitality - if they're getting into a groove they really do make it funky".

Track listing
 "Friends In High Places" (Russell Fragar) — 03:51 — lead vocals: Darlene Zschech
 "He Shall Be Called" (Fragar) — 03:00 — lead vocals: Lucy Fisher
 "Praise His Holy Name" (Darlene Zschech) — 03:25 — lead vocals: Darlene Zschech
 "Rock Of The Ages" (Geoff Bullock, Zschech) — 03:23 — lead vocals: Donia Makedonez
 "Whenever I See" (Bullock) — 03:48 — lead vocals: Steve McPherson
 "Now Is The Time" (Bullock) — 05:17 — lead vocals: Rob Eastwood
 "You're All I Need" (Bullock) — 05:13 — lead vocals: Geoff Bullock, Darlene Zschech
 "Salvation" (Bullock) — 03:35 — lead vocalss: Darlene Zschech
 "Holding On" (Bullock) — 03:32 — lead vocals: Darlene Zschech, Geoff Bullock
 "Because Of Your Love" (Fragar) — 02:52 — lead vocals: Darlene Zschech b. Craig Gower
 "King Of Kings" (Bullock) — 03:14 — lead vocals: Darlene Zschech
 "Lord I Give Myself" (Zschech) — 02:30 — lead vocals: Darlene Zschech
 "I'll Worship You" (Bullock) — 04:32 — lead vocals: Darlene Zschech; Geoff Bullock
 "This Kingdom" (Bullock) — 06:01 — lead vocals: Darlene Zschech
 "I Can't Wait" (Fragar) — 05:12 — lead vocals: Donia Makedonez; Lucy Fisher; Russell Fragar

Credits
 David Moyse - guitar, engineer
 Jeff Todd - engineer
 William Bowden - mastering
 Darlene Zschech - vocals, vocal producer
 Michael Murphy - executive producer
 Megan Parker - saxophone
 Russell Fragar - piano, keyboards, vocals, producer, engineer
 Geoff Bullock - piano, vocals
 Janine Bullock - choir director
 Annabelle Chaffey - choir director
 Ruth Grant - background vocals
 Allan Chard - guitar
 Wayne Davis - bass
 Adam Simek - drums
 Stuart Fell - percussion
 Karl Stone - trombone
 Rob Eastwood - vocals
 Mark Gregory - trumpet
 Donia Makedonez - vocals
 Nick Asha - engineer
 Trevor Beck - engineer, assistant engineer
 Erica Crocker - background vocals
 Lucy Fisher - vocals
 Craig Gower - keyboards, background vocals
 Brian Houston - executive producer
 Andrew McPherson - engineer
 Steve McPherson - vocals

References 

1995 live albums
Hillsong Music live albums